Jos Louis is a Canadian confection consisting of two chocolate cake rounds with a cream filling within a milk chocolate shell, made  by Vachon Inc. It resembles a chocolate version of the May West dessert. It was created in 1932 and named after two of the Vachon sons, Joseph and Louis ("Jos" is a traditional contraction of "Joseph").

Variations 
The Jos Louis is also available in a 30-gram half-moon shape, called the 1/2 Jos Louis, and a bar-shaped version called the Jos Louis bar. The bar contains the normal cream filling found in the Jos Louis and also has a chocolate filling and weighs 53 grams. The ½ Moon cake is essentially a Jos Louis without the chocolaty coating, but has a smaller portion size of 51 grams. The ½ Moon is available in either chocolate or vanilla. A double-layered variant, the Super Jos Louis, has a layer of cream filling in the middle.

In 2006, Entenmann's began distributing an equivalent of the ½ Moon in the US, with "Enten-Mini's Chocolate Half Rounds".

References

External links
 Vachon

Brand name snack foods
Canadian snack foods
Products introduced in 1932